Headhunters is a 2011 Norwegian action thriller film based on the 2008 novel of the same name by Jo Nesbø. The film was directed by Morten Tyldum and stars Aksel Hennie, Nikolaj Coster-Waldau and Synnøve Macody Lund. Hennie portrays the successful but insecure corporate recruiter Roger Brown who lives a double life as an art thief to fund his lavish lifestyle. He finds out that one of his job prospects is in possession of a valuable painting and sets out to steal it.

Released in Norway on 26 August 2011, Headhunters was a box office success, receiving positive reviews, and was nominated for multiple awards, including four Amanda Awards and a BAFTA Award for Best Foreign Language Film.

It is the highest-grossing Norwegian film in history.

Plot
Roger Brown (Aksel Hennie), Norway's most successful headhunter, supports his lavish lifestyle by stealing paintings from his clients; his partner, Ove (Eivind Sander), works at a surveillance company and deactivates security at the victims' homes, allowing Roger to swap the art for a counterfeit. Asked to dinner by his mistress, Lotte (Julie Ølgaard), Roger declines and ends their relationship. Roger's wife and art gallery owner, Diana (Synnøve Macody Lund), introduces him to Clas Greve (Nikolaj Coster-Waldau), a former executive for GPS tech company HOTE. Roger, currently seeking to recruit the next CEO of rival firm Pathfinder, recognizes Clas may be a suitable candidate. Diana reveals that Clas has asked her to authenticate a lost Rubens painting he inherited that is believed to be worth millions.

Roger convinces Clas to meet with him over lunch to discuss the job, and soon learns Clas used to be a member of TRACK, a special forces unit that specialized in tracking people and winner of the European Military pentathlon. He also learns that Clas helped HOTE develop a nanotechnology GPS tracking gel that is difficult to remove. Despite his misgivings, Roger meets with Ove to work out details on stealing the painting. Roger manages to steal it from Clas' home, but he discovers Diana's cellphone beside Clas' bed, implying the two of them are having an affair due to Roger's refusal to have children with Diana. In retaliation, after a seemingly successful meeting with Pathfinder executives, an upset Roger flippantly informs Clas that the company may be looking for someone else to fill the position.

The next morning, Roger finds Ove in his (Roger's) car, apparently dead from a poison syringe embedded in the car seat; just as Roger dumps Ove in a lake, Ove recovers, as he did not get a full dose of the poison. Driving Ove to his cabin, Roger puts him in bed and ignores his demands for medical attention, as he does not want the police involved. Ove pulls a gun in response, causing a shoot-out where Roger accidentally kills Ove. Finding Clas has followed him to Ove's cabin, Roger narrowly escapes after a scuffle. After realising Clas may have used HOTE's GPS gel technology on him, Roger switches his car for Ove's and throws his clothes in a lake, changing into Ove's spare uniform and fleeing to a farm where Ove used to stay. Nevertheless, Clas tails Roger to the farm with his dog and murders the farmer, but Roger evades them. Trying to escape on a tractor, Roger is attacked by Clas' dog, which he kills by impaling it on the tractor's forks. Roger, believing Clas is still chasing him, drives erratically and falls from the tractor, only to find his pursuer is a stranger wanting to help.

Waking in a hospital, Roger learns the police think he is Ove, and arrest him for the farmer's murder when he tries to escape. Driving to the station, the officers pull over to block a truck reported stolen. Roger realizes that Clas is driving the truck, and that Diana may have helped Clas by rubbing the GPS gel into Roger's hair. With Clas approaching, the officers ignore Roger's protests, allowing Clas to ram the car off a cliff. Playing dead until Clas leaves the scene, Roger shaves his head and hides his hair on a deceased officer's body, then swaps clothes with a detective's disfigured body to fake his death.

Roger turns to Lotte for help, only to discover she is working for Clas. Clas, who is still secretly employed by HOTE, was planning to use Roger to get the Pathfinder job and steal their secret technologies. Lotte admits that she put the GPS gel in Roger's hair, absolving Diana, and that she suggested dinner so she could introduce him to Clas; since Roger ended their affair, Clas used a counterfeit Rubens painting to meet Roger through Diana. When Roger lets his guard down, Lotte attacks him with a knife, causing Roger to shoot and kill her in self-defense. Roger returns home and admits everything to Diana, who apologizes for her affair with Clas. The next morning, Roger goes to a morgue to retrieve the remaining evidence linking him to the murders (his cut hair), while Diana contacts Clas to ostensibly resume their affair.

While cleaning Ove's cabin of evidence, Roger is confronted by Clas, who was able to track the GPS gel in the cut hair. Clas gloats that Diana has returned to him, and tries to shoot Roger but fails. Roger fatally wounds Clas with a hidden gun, explaining that Diana only resumed their affair so she could load Clas' gun with blanks. Ove's home security records Clas involved in a shootout, though Roger stays in a camera blind spot near Ove. The footage, combined with evidence doctored by Roger, suggests Ove and Clas were art thieves who killed the farmer, Lotte, then finally each other after a dispute. The police, including star detective Brede Sperre, ignore the minor inconsistencies (Ove's time of death being days earlier than what is implied by the video footage) because Brede knows that leaving the case unsolved would harm his growing reputation. Later, Roger and a visibly pregnant Diana are shown selling their house, and Roger returns to work, giving the Pathfinder job to the client he rejected and robbed at the beginning of the film.

Cast
 Aksel Hennie as Roger Brown
 Synnøve Macody Lund as Diana Brown
 Nikolaj Coster-Waldau as Clas Greve
  as Ove Kjikerud
 Julie Ølgaard as Lotte Madsen
 Reidar Sørensen as Brede Sperre
 as Jeremias Lander
 Mads Mogeland as Joar Sunded
 Baard Owe as Sindre Aa
 Torgrim Mellum Stene as Atle Nerum
  as Ferdinand
 Nils Jørgen Kaalstad as Stig
  as Brugd
 Gunnar Skramstad Johnsen as Eskild Monsen
 Lars Skramstad Johnsen as Endride Monsen

Production and remake
 
The Swedish production company Yellow Bird acquired the film rights to Jo Nesbø's 2008 novel Headhunters in 2009. It was the first of Nesbø's novels to be turned into a film. The film was shot in and around Oslo on a budget of 30 million NOK over 40 days. The film lacked aerial shots that they needed but ran out of money and instead archive footage scenes from the Swedish film The Girl with the Dragon Tattoo was used and was digitally altered to change the type of car.

A Hollywood remake of Headhunters was planned, with the British journalist and screenwriter Sacha Gervasi writing the screenplay. The rights to the English-language remake were sold to the American film studio Summit Entertainment in 2011 while the Norwegian film was still in production.

Music
 
Tracks used in the movie include:
 "Weathervane" by Weathervane (writing name of Jimmy Gnecco and Paul Waaktaar-Savoy) - over the end credits
 "Sleep Ferrari" published by Universal Publishing Production Music (no artist given)
 "Come  by Goran Obad and Henrik Skarm

Release
The film was released in Norway on 26 August 2011 and was seen by 104,000 Norwegian moviegoers in its opening weekend, making it the second best opening weekend in Norwegian history, after Max Manus. It was by far the most-watched domestic film of the year, with 557,086 tickets sold at the cinema, and the second most-watched including foreign films, only beaten by Harry Potter and the Deathly Hallows – Part 2.

Reception
 
Headhunters received very positive reviews. Rotten Tomatoes reports a "Certified Fresh" approval rating of 93% based on 98 reviews, with an average rating of 7.63 out of 10. The consensus reads: "Grisly, twisty, and darkly comic, Headhunters is an exhilaratingly oddball take on familiar thriller elements". On Metacritic, the film has a score of 72 out of 100, indicating "generally favorable reviews", based on reviews from 26 critics.

Roger Ebert of the Chicago Sun-Times gave the film three and a half stars out of four, praising the film as "an argument for the kinds of thrillers I miss. It entertains with story elements, in which the scares evolve from human behavior. Unlike too many thrillers that depend on stunts, special effects and the Queasy cam, this one devises a plot where it matters what happens. It's not all kinetic energy".

In Norway the film got favourable reviews; with most reviewers following the "die throw" system, where 1 is worst and 6 is best, the vast majority gave 5 points. The die throw of 5 was issued by VG, Dagbladet, Aftenposten, Bergens Tidende, Bergensavisen, Stavanger Aftenblad, Dagsavisen, Fædrelandsvennen, Haugesunds Avis and Hamar Arbeiderblad. The die throw of 4 was issued by Adresseavisen. and Klassekampen. Dagens Næringsliv,  called the film "highly acceptable" genre action with a sympathetic lead character.

Accolades
 
Headhunters was the first Norwegian film to be nominated for a BAFTA (in the category Best Film Not in the English Language). The film was also nominated for four Amanda Awards: People's Amanda (audience vote), Best Actor, Best Direction and Best Visual Effects, but not for Best Norwegian Film, leading to criticism of the Amanda jury.

See also
 Scandinavian noir

References

External links
  – official site
 

2011 films
Norwegian action thriller films
2011 action thriller films
2010s Norwegian-language films
2011 crime thriller films
2010s Danish-language films
Films based on crime novels
Films based on Norwegian novels
Films shot in Norway
Films set in Norway
Films directed by Morten Tyldum
Films based on works by Jo Nesbø
2011 multilingual films
Norwegian multilingual films